Chereuta tinthalea is a moth in the family Xyloryctidae. It was described by Edward Meyrick in 1906. It is found in Australia, where it has been recorded from the Australian Capital Territory and New South Wales.

The wingspan is 12–13 mm. The forewings are blackish with white irroration (speckling), which forms indistinct oblique bands, the first from the costa near the base to the dorsum near the middle, the second from the costa before the middle to the dorsum beyond the middle, the third from three-fourths of the costa to the tornus. There is a terminal series of white dots. The hindwings are blackish.

References

Xyloryctidae
Moths described in 1906